Montserrado-5 is an electoral district for the elections to the House of Representatives of Liberia. The district covers the Paynesville communities of 72nd Community, Police Academy, Bassa Town, Red Light, A.B. Tolbert Road and Town Hall, as well as the Congo Town communities of Swankamore and Pagos Island..

Elected representatives

References

Electoral districts in Liberia